Mona Al Munajjed is a Saudi sociologist and expert on the social role of women in Arab countries. She has worked with several United Nations agencies on projects related to child labour, gender and development in Arab countries.

Life
Mona Al Munajjed gained a MA in sociology from New York University and a PhD in sociology from George Washington University. as first social affairs officer at the United Nations Economic and Social Commission for Western Asia. Her project "Activating the Role of Women's Welfare Associations in Saudi Arabia", funded by Abdul Latif Jameel Company Ltd, pioneered the funding of UN projects in Saudi Arabia by the private sector. In 2005 she received the UN 21 award for the project. 

Since 2011 she has been named in CEO Middle East 's list of the 100 Most Powerful Arab Women. She was named as #7 in their list of the 100 Most Powerful Arab Women 2015.

Works
 Mādhā tusammīna ibnataki : akthar min sitt miʼat ism min ajmal al-asmāʼ al-ʻArabīyah maʻa bayān maʻānīhā wa-man tasammat min al-mashhūrāt bi-hā, 1983
 Child labour in the Arab countries, 1994
 Women in Saudi Arabia Today, 1995
 Saudi Women Speak: 24 remarkable women tell their success stories, 2006

References

Living people
Year of birth missing (living people)
New York University alumni
Women's studies academics
Saudi Arabian women sociologists
21st-century Saudi Arabian writers
21st-century Saudi Arabian women writers
Columbian College of Arts and Sciences alumni